Qatar is a peninsula in the east of Arabia, bordering the Persian Gulf and Saudi Arabia, in a strategic location near major petroleum deposits.

Notable features include coastal salt pans, elevated limestone formations (the Dukhan anticline) along the west coast under which lies the Dukhan oil field, and massive sand dunes surrounding Khawr al Udayd, an inlet of the Persian Gulf in the southeast known to local English speakers as the Inland Sea.

General topography
The peninsula of Qatar is low-lying. Its shape is the surface expression of the Qatar Arch, one of the largest structural characteristics of the Arabian Plate. It is enveloped by loose sand and pebbles broken off the outcropping limestone. Smooth plains are found in the east, where the surface is covered by fine-grained dust. The south and south-west portion of the peninsula mainly comprises sand dunes and salt flats. Hill ranges (called 'jebels') can be found in western Qatar near the Dukhan area and at Jebel Fuwayrit on the northeast coast. Jebel Nakhsh is a notable mountain ridge south of Dukhan and contains substantial deposits of gypsum.

The coastline, which is roughly 700km², is emergent and gently slopes toward the sea. Many flat, low-lying offshore islands are located near the coast and are accompanied by coral reefs. As a result of salt water coming into contact with the low-lying land, many salt flats (known locally as sabkhas) have formed near the coast. The coastline from Mesaieed to Khawr al Udayd is particularly rich in sabkhas. Inland sabkhas can be found in western in Qatar near Dukhan and Sawda Natheel.

A sabkha (salt-flat) ecosystem known as the Dukhan Sabkha is found in the northern section of the Dukhan region in western Qatar. This sabkha, considered the largest inland sabkha in the Persian Gulf, runs for approximately 20 km, occupies an area of 73 km², has a width of 2 to 4 km and a depth of between 6 and 7 meters. It also accommodates the lowest point of Qatar, at six meters below sea level. Studies suggest that the sabkha is fed by seawater from the Bay of Zekreet, north by approximately 3 km.

Climate
The long summer (June through September) is characterized by intense heat and alternating dryness and humidity, with temperatures exceeding .

Sudden, violent dust storms occasionally descend on the peninsula, blotting out the sun, causing wind damage, and temporarily disrupting transport and other services.

The scarcity of rainfall and the limited underground water, most of which has such a high mineral content that it is unsuitable for drinking or irrigation, severely restricted the population and the extent of agricultural and industrial development the country could support until desalination projects began. Although water continues to be provided from underground sources, most is obtained by desalination of seawater.

Wildlife

Flora

Although most of the country consists of sand deserts, a small part of the country houses different vegetation zones, where trees, reeds and shrubs like tamarind, phragmites, and mace can grow. These regions are mostly to the east, near the coast. The inherent limiting factor for vegetation growth is water availability. Certain geographical features partially alleviate this water scarcity, such as rawdas, which are large depressions found on the soil surface and which help recharge the aquifers. As these sites constitute the most easily obtainable sources of shallow groundwater, they are also among the areas most abundant in wild vegetation.

In the south, where groundwater is exceedingly scarce, vegetation can found growing in wadis (dry river valleys) fed by run-off from nearby hills and in rawdas.

Fauna

There are 21 species of mammals that have been recorded in Qatar. Larger terrestrial mammals such as the Arabian oryx and Arabian gazelle are protected animals and are held in nature reserves. The Arabian gazelle is the only native gazelle species to Qatar and is locally referred to as 'rheem'. 

Qatar's territorial waters in the Persian Gulf are rich in marine life. Sea turtles nest en masse on the coastline from Fuwayrit to Ras Laffan. The Ministry of Environment (MME) carries out routine patrols of nesting areas to ensure their conservation. Dugongs are known to congregate off the country's coasts. In the course of a study being carried out in 1986 and 1999 on the Persian Gulf, the largest-ever group sightings were made of more than 600 individuals to the west of Qatar.

Area and land boundaries

Qatar has one land border. The country borders Saudi Arabia to the south. The boundary with Saudi Arabia was settled in 1965 but never demarcated. The peninsula's northernmost point is Ras Rakan.

Maritime claims
contiguous zone:

exclusive economic zone:
 as determined by bilateral agreements, or the median line
territorial sea:

Islands

Of the islands belonging to Qatar, Halul is the most important. Hawar and the adjacent islands immediately off the west coast are the subject of a territorial dispute between Qatar and Bahrain.

Resources and land use

Based on estimates in 2011 estimates, 5.6% of the land is agricultural. Arable land comprises 1.1%, permanent crops 0.2% and permanent pasture 4.6%. 94.4% of the land was used for other uses. In 2003,  of land was irrigated.

Geology and mineral deposits

Most  of Qatar's surface lies on Cenozoic strata. These strata have an abundance of mineral resources, most of which have not yet been exploited, such as limestone and clay. The Upper Dammam Formation in the Middle Eocene period is the most predominant surface layer. It is constituted by limestone and Dolomite. The northern zone of Qatar, which comprises the most significant source of fresh groundwater in the peninsula, primarily draws its water from the Umm Err Radhuma Formation and Rus Formation dating to the Paleocene and Lower Eocene periods, respectively. The Mesozoic strata are the most important layers as they contain petroleum. The first substantial deposit of crude oil was discovered in 1940 in the Jurassic period Arab Formation.

Political and human geography

The capital, Doha, is located on the central east coast on a sweeping (if shallow) harbor. Other ports include Umm Said, Al Khawr, and Al Wakrah. Only Doha and Umm Said are capable of handling commercial shipping, although a large port and a terminal for loading natural gas are planned at Ras Laffan Industrial City, north of Al Khawr. Coral reefs and shallow coastal waters make navigation difficult in areas where channels have not been dredged.

Doha is the capital of the country and the major administrative, commercial, and population center. Doha's international airport has an approximately  main runway, capable of receiving all kinds of aircraft.

Historically, settlement distribution in Qatar has mainly been dictated by the presence of obtainable fresh groundwater. Rawdas, which are depressions with shallow groundwater, have typically been the most popular sites of settlement throughout the peninsula. In Qatar's south, where groundwater is exceedingly difficult to obtain, settlement formation was mostly limited to wadis (dry river valleys) fed by run-off from nearby hills and rawdas.

Environmental agreements
Qatar is currently party to the following international environmental agreements:
Biodiversity
Climate Change
Desertification
Hazardous Wastes
Law of the Sea
Ozone Layer Protection

References

Bibliography

External links